Bjørn Ousland (born 14 May 1959) is a Norwegian illustrator, children's writer and comics writer. His breakthrough was the album series Solruns saga from 1988 to 1993. Among his later albums are Mumle Gåsegg from 1999, Soria Moria slott from 2000, and Grimsborken from 2002, all adapted from Norwegian fairy tales. He was awarded the Brage Prize (open class) in 2007, jointly with Jon Ewo.

References

1959 births
Living people
Norwegian illustrators
Norwegian children's book illustrators
Norwegian children's writers
Norwegian comics writers